The Georgia Mountain Fairgrounds, which opened in 1978, is home to several popular events throughout the year including the Georgia Mountain Fair, Georgia Mountain Moonshine Cruiz-In, Georgia Mountain Fall Festival, Superstar concerts, and Georgia's Official State Fiddlers' Convention. Located on a  tact along the shores of Lake Chatuge in the north Georgia mountain community of Hiawassee, the Fairgrounds offers a glimpse into the past with its historic Pioneer Village, an expansive and comfortable music venue in the Anderson Music Hall, the Hamilton Rhododendron Gardens and 189 RV camp sites with lake views and modern conveniences.

See also

External links
 Georgia Mountain Fairgrounds - official site

Fairgrounds in the United States
Buildings and structures in Towns County, Georgia
Tourist attractions in Towns County, Georgia
Gardens in Georgia (U.S. state)